Lambda (written λ, in lowercase) is a non-SI unit of volume equal to 10−9 m3, 1 cubic millimetre (mm3) or 1 microlitre (μL). Introduced by the BIPM in 1880, the lambda has been used in chemistry and in law for measuring volume, but its use is not recommended.

This use of λ parallels the pre-SI use of μ on its own for a micrometre and γ for a microgram. Although the use of λ is deprecated, some clinical laboratories continue to use it. The standard abbreviation μL for a microlitre has the disadvantage that it can be misread as mL (a unit 1000 times larger). In pharmaceutical use, no abbreviation for a microlitre is considered safe. The recommended practice is to write "microlitre" in full.

References

Units of volume
Customary units of measurement
Typographical symbols
Non-SI metric units